Sam Smith Park is a public park operated by Seattle Parks and Recreation, in Seattle, Washington, United States. The park has a bicycle and pedestrian tunnel integrated with the Mount Baker Tunnel. Exercise equipment and tennis courts are also available.

See also 

 List of parks in Seattle

References

External links 
 
 

Parks in Seattle